Miss Vietnam 2018 (Vietnamese: Hoa hậu Việt Nam 2018) was the 16th edition of the Miss Vietnam pageant. It was held on September 16, 2018 at Phu Tho Indoor Stadium, Ho Chi Minh City, Vietnam. Miss Vietnam 2016 Đỗ Mỹ Linh crowned her successor Trần Tiểu Vy at the end of the event.

The pageant crowned the Vietnam representatives to compete in four of international beauty pageants: Miss World 2018, Miss Grand International 2018, Miss Grand International 2021, Miss Intercontinental 2019 and Miss International 2018.

Results

Placements
Color keys

 
§ Winner Beauty with a Purpose Vietnam automatically advanced to Top 5

Note: Nguyễn Thị Thúy An was not able to compete in Miss International 2018 because of unexpected health problems. For this reason, Nguyễn Thúc Thùy Tiên replaced her to become Vietnam's representative at pageant.

Special Awards

Contestants
43 contestants in the final.

References

Beauty pageants in Vietnam
2018 beauty pageants
Vietnamese awards
September 2018 events in Vietnam